Roy Desmond "Buster" Cairns (15 February 1925 – 13 November 2010) was a Canadian soccer player. He was a five-time national champion with Canadian clubs Vancouver City FC (1950) and Westminster Royals FC (1953, 1955, 1958, 1960). He was also Canada's starting left back for three matches during FIFA World Cup Qualifiers in 1957. After his retirement, he became an honoured member of the Canada Soccer Hall of Fame.

In the Pacific Coast League, Cairns won five championships, one with Vancouver St. Andrews (1947-48) and four with the Westminster Royals FC (1952-53, 1956, 1957, and 1960-61). He was a regular all-star selection, representing British Columbia in four-straight years from 1950 to 1953 and then again in 1957. Along with winning five Dominion titles, he also won three runner-up medals (1951 with St. Andrews, 1952 and 1959 with Westminster).

He was at his best in 1953 when he was most valuable player of the Dominion of Canada Football Championship. After winning the national title, he captained Westminster to the North American Club Championship over the Chicago Falcons.

In later years Cairns worked as a volunteer in the Crime Prevention Office of the New Westminster Police Office. He was inducted into Abbotsford Sports Hall of Fame in 2008.

References

External links
 / Canada Soccer Hall of Fame
Canada Soccer Hall of Fame
Canada Soccer Records & Results

1925 births
2010 deaths
Soccer people from British Columbia
Canada men's international soccer players
Canada Soccer Hall of Fame inductees
Canadian soccer players
Canadian people of British descent
Association football defenders
Sportspeople_from_Abbotsford,_British_Columbia
People from New Westminster
Vancouver City S.C. players
Vancouver St. Andrews players
Westminster Royals (soccer) players